Olba is a municipality located in the province of Teruel, Aragon, Spain. According to the 2005 census (INE), the municipality had a population of 233 inhabitants.

The fashion designer Manuel Pertegaz, considered Spain's leading couturier during the 1960s, was born in Olba in 1917.

References

Municipalities in the Province of Teruel